Territory Cops is an Australian factual television show that looks at the work of the police in Northern Territory, Australia. This observational documentary series began on the Crime and Investigation Network, premiering on 11 October 2012.

A second season of the series was commissioned by Network Ten in February 2016 to air in the first quarter. It was later announced that the new season would be narrated by Australian actor, and star of the Wolf Creek movie and TV series, John Jarratt.

In a February 2017 interview, Ten's Chief Content Officer Beverley McGarvey confirmed that there were no plans to air further seasons of the program.

After a five year hiatus, a third series of Territory Cops was re-commissioned by Network Ten in October 2020 and will premiere at 8:00 pm on 25 February 2021.

Series Overview

Episodes

Season 1 (2012)

Season 2 (2016)

Season 3 (2021)

See also
Kalgoorlie Cops
Gold Coast Cops
Beach Cops
The Force: Behind the Line
Highway Patrol (Australian TV series)
Border Security: Australia's Front Line
AFP

References

External links

Crime & Investigation Network — Official website

Network 10 original programming
2012 Australian television series debuts
2016 Australian television series endings
Television shows set in the Northern Territory
Australian factual television series
English-language television shows
Documentary television series about policing
Television series by Warner Bros. Television Studios